China University of Technology (CUTe) is a private university in Taipei, Taiwan. The original campus is situated in Taipei's Wenshan District on five hectares of land. Since 2000, the owner has opened a second campus on 14 hectares of land in the Hukou township of Hsinchu County, Taiwan.

History
CUTe was founded in 1965 as Chinese Municipal Vocational School. In 1983, the school was renamed to China Junior College of Industrial and Commercial Management. In 2000, the school was renamed again as Chung Kuo Institute of Technology. Finally, in 2005 the school was elevated to university status and on 1 August of the same year, it was renamed China University of Technology.

Faculties
 College of Business
 College of Computer Science
 College of Management
 College of Planning and Design

Campuses
The university is divided into two campuses, which are Taipei Campus and Hsinchu Campus. The Taipei Campus spans over an area of 5 hectares and Hsinchu Campus spans over 14 hectares.

Transportation
The Taipei campus of the university is accessible within walking distance West from Wanfang Hospital Station of the Taipei Metro. The Hsinchu campus of the university is accessible within walking distance South from Beihu Station of the Taiwan Railways.

See also
 List of universities in Taiwan

References

1965 establishments in Taiwan
Educational institutions established in 1965
Private universities and colleges in Taiwan
Universities and colleges in Hsinchu County
Universities and colleges in Taipei